Dhimitri Fotaq Strakosha (born 26 October 1991) is a professional footballer who last played as a striker for Ethnikos in the Greek third tier in 2015.

Club career
Strakosha was born in Piraeus, Greece. He has played for Olimpiku Tirana in the Albanian Second Division and KF Himara in the Albanian First Division.

Personal life
Dhimitri is the son of Foto Strakosha, former goalkeeper of the Albania national team from 1990 to 2005, now currently part of the technical staff of Olympiacos. He is the older brother of Thomas Strakosha, also a footballer who plays for Lazio.

References

1991 births
Living people
Footballers from Piraeus
Greek people of Albanian descent
Albanian footballers
Association football forwards
KF Olimpik Tirana players
KF Himara players
Ethnikos Piraeus F.C. players
Kategoria e Parë players
Kategoria e Dytë players